Derrick Morse is a former American football player who played for the Jacksonville Sharks. He played as a guard for the University of Miami. He was signed as an undrafted free agent by the Jacksonville Sharks in 2010.

References

1985 births
Living people
American football offensive guards
American football defensive linemen
Miami Hurricanes football players
University of Miami alumni
Jacksonville Sharks players
Players of American football from Florida